Banyaran-e Aziz Morad (also Romanized as Bānyārān-e ʿAzīz Morād) is a village in Gurani Rural District, Gahvareh District, Dalahu County, Kermanshah Province, Iran. At the 2006 census, its population was 80, in 20 families.

References 

Populated places in Dalahu County